Irina Bogacheva may refer to:
 Irina Bogacheva (athlete)
 Irina Bogacheva (mezzo-soprano)